ABCorp is an American corporation providing contract manufacturing and related services to the authentication, payment and secure access business sectors. Its history dates back to 1795 as a secure engraver and printer, and assisting the newly formed First Bank of the United States to design and produce more counterfeit resistant currency. The company has facilities in the United States, Canada, Australia, and New Zealand. The American Bank Note Company is a wholly owned subsidiary of ABCorp.

Origins
Robert Scot, the first official engraver of the young U.S. Mint, began the company that would eventually grow into a high security engraving and printing firm, the American Bank Note Company.

Founded in 1795 as Murray, Draper, Fairman & Company after Scot's three partners, the company prospered as United States population expanded and financial institutions proliferated. Its products included stock and bond certificates, paper currency for the nation's thousands of state-chartered banks, postage stamps (from 1879 to 1894), and a wide variety of other engraved and printed items.  Two security printers absorbed into the ABN in 1879 produced U. S. Postage stamps between 1861 and that year: the National Bank Note Company (1861-73) and the Continental Banknote Company (1873-79).

After 1857
On April 29, 1858, following the Panic of 1857, seven prominent security printers merged to form the American Bank Note Company. The new company made New York City its headquarters. Less than two years later, the remaining handful of independent bank note printers merged to form the National Bank Note Company.

To be close to the stock exchanges, brokerage firms, and banks in lower Manhattan, the American Bank Note Company established its headquarters in the Merchants Exchange Building at 55 Wall Street in Manhattan. The company moved its office and plant to 142 Broadway (at the corner of Liberty Street) in 1867, to another new facility at 78–86 Trinity Place in 1882, and again to 70 Broad Street in 1908.

The first federally issued paper currency was circulated by the US Treasury Department following the outbreak of the American Civil War. Congress passed authorizing legislation for $60 million worth of these "Demand Notes" on July 17 and August 5, 1861. Under contract with the government, the novel paper money, called "greenbacks" by the public, was produced by the American Bank Note Co. and the National Bank Note Co. A total of 7.25 million notes were produced in denominations of $5, $10, and $20. American and National were also producing paper money for the Confederacy at the same time.

Following the initial production of U.S. currency by the government's Bureau of Engraving and Printing in 1862, ABNCo sought a new business abroad. The company eventually supplied security paper and bank notes to 115 foreign countries.

In 1877 Congress mandated that the U.S. Bureau of Engraving and Printing be the sole producer of all United States currency.  The security printing industry, finding a good deal of its work had evaporated, accordingly underwent a second major consolidation in 1879, as American absorbed the National Bank Note and Continental Bank Note companies.  At the time of the merger, Continental held the contract to produce U. S. Postage stamps, and this production continued under American.

In 1887, ABNCo won the second four-year contract to engrave and print postal notes for the U.S. post office. (New York's Homer Lee Bank Note Company produced these notes during the first contract period.) American assigned Thomas F. Morris, its Chief Designer, the task of re-designing this early money order. The paper for this contract (as for all Postal Notes and a massive number of official U.S. high security documents) was produced by Crane and Co. of Dalton, Massachusetts.

In 1891 the American Bank Note Company began producing a new form of negotiable instrument for a longtime customer: the American Express “Traveler's Cheque” demand notes. In its first year, American Express sold $9,120 worth the product.

In 1894, ABNCo completed the final contract for the private printing of American stamps.  Perhaps the most popular were the Columbian Issue, one cent to $5 issues commemorating the voyages of Christopher Columbus and the 1892–93 Columbian Exposition in Chicago (for which they also printed the admission tickets). On July 1, 1894, American delivered its entire stamp-producing operation to the U.S. Bureau of Engraving and Printing in Washington, D.C., where U.S. stamps were still printed up into the 1990s.

Twentieth century

In 1933, the company printed the second series of Bank Melli Iran banknotes.

In 1943 the U.S. Post Office launched a series of thirteen stamps honoring the countries that had been overrun by the Axis during World War II. Each stamp featured a full-color reproduction of one of the occupied nations. While the Bureau of Engraving and Printing had previously issued bi-colored stamps, it did not have equipment for printing the necessary multi-colored flag images; and so, contracted with the American Banknote Company to produce the stamps.  Issued between June 1943 and November 1944, the Overrun Countries series reproduced the flags of Poland, Czechoslovakia, Norway, Luxembourg, the Netherlands, Belgium, France, Greece, Yugoslavia, Albania, Austria, Denmark, and Korea,

ABCorp
American Banknote Corporation is headquartered in Stamford, Connecticut, with North American manufacturing facilities located in Boston, Massachusetts, and Toronto, Ontario, and distribution services located in Columbia, Tennessee.

Today, ABCorp offers a wide variety of products and services touching each of the commercial, financial, and government and non-profit sectors ranging from dual-interface (contactless) payment debit and credit cards to B2B (Business to Business) distribution services touching 60,000+ retail storefronts. The company has operations located in the United States, Canada, Australia, and New Zealand, and customers in over 120 countries across the globe.

Landmark buildings
The American Bank Note Company Building and American Bank Note Company Printing Plant were both built in 1908 and are both designated New York City Landmarks.  The former is also listed on the U.S. National Register of Historic Places.  The buildings were sold in 1988 and 1985, respectively.

Gallery

See also
Canadian Bank Note Company - Canadian unit from 1897 to 1923
New York Bank Note Company
Postage stamp
Postage stamps and postal history of the United States

References and sources

References

Sources

Antecedents of the American Bank Note Company of 1858 by Foster Wild Rice
The Story of the American Bank Note Company by William H. Griffiths
America’s Money America’s Story by Richard Doty
The Comprehensive Catalog of U.S. Paper Money by Gene Hessler

External links 

 Official website

Postal history
Postage stamps of the United States
Printing companies of the United States
Banknote printing companies
Publishing companies established in 1795
Companies based in Stamford, Connecticut